This is a list of notable hereditary and lineage organizations, and is informed by the database of the Hereditary Society Community of the United States of America. It includes societies that limit their membership to those who meet group inclusion criteria, such as descendants of a particular person or group of people of historical importance. It does not include general ethnic heritage societies.

A

Ancient and Honorable Artillery Company of Massachusetts
Aztec Club of 1847
Associated Daughters of Early American Witches
Association Royale des Descendants des Lignages de Bruxelles

B

 The Baronial Order of Magna Charta
 Bloodlines of Salem

C

 Children of the American Revolution
 Children of the Confederacy
 Cleveland Grays
 The Colonial Dames of America

D

 Daughters of Hawaii
 Daughters of the American Revolution
 Daughters of the Cincinnati
 Daughters of the Republic of Texas

F

 Flagon and Trencher

G

General Society of Colonial Wars
General Society of the War of 1812
General Society Sons of the Revolution

H

 Hereditary Order of Descendants of Colonial Governors
 Holland Society of New York
 The Huguenot Society of America

I

 International Society Daughters of Utah Pioneers

J

 Jamestowne Society
 Job's Daughters International

L

Ladies of the Grand Army of the Republic
Legion of Valor of the United States of America

M

 The Mayflower Society
 Military Order of Foreign Wars of the United States
 Military Order of the Carabao
 Military Order of the Loyal Legion of the United States
 Military Order of the Stars and Bars
 Monticello Association

N

National Society Children of the American Colonists
National Society of the Colonial Dames of America
National Society Daughters of the American Colonists
National Society of New England Women
National Society Sons of the American Colonists
National Society of Sons of Utah Pioneers
National Society United States Daughters of 1812
Naval Order of the United States
New England Society in the City of New York

O

 Order of Daedalians
 Order of the First Families of Virginia
 Order of Lafayette
 Order of the Founders and Patriots of America

P

 Pioneers of Alaska

R

 Russian Nobility Association in America

S

Saint Nicholas Society of the City of New York
Society of California Pioneers
Society of Colonial Wars
Society of the Cincinnati
Society of the Descendants of the Schwenkfeldian Exiles
Society of the Descendants of the Founders of Hartford
Sons and Daughters of Oregon Pioneers
Sons of the Revolution
Sons of the American Legion
Sons of the American Revolution
Sons of Confederate Veterans
Sons of Union Veterans of the Civil War
Sons of Utah Pioneers
Swedish Colonial Society

U

Union des Descendants des Commandeurs Hereditaires et Chevaliers du Grand Prieure Russe de l'Ordre de St Jean de Jerusalem
 United Daughters of the Confederacy
 United Empire Loyalist Association of Canada

V

 Veteran Corps of Artillery State of New York

W

 Winthrop Society

See also
Family history society
Lineage-bonded society

External links

The Hereditary Society Community

References

Hereditary and lineage|Genealogical societies